Emily Frances Godschall Johnson better known as Edith Johnson (1874–1950) was an English field hockey, tennis and badminton player. She was the first women's captain of the England hockey team and the runner-up at the 1910 Wimbledon Championships – Women's singles.

Johnson played for the Molesey Hockey Club and was involved in England's first official match against Ireland in 1896. She was an all-round sportswoman playing tennis at Wimbledon where she competed in the singles from 1901 to 1914. In addition to tennis and hockey she played badminton for the East Molesey club and played at the All England Open Badminton Championships on several occasions.

References

1874 births
1950 deaths
British female tennis players
Tennis people from Surrey
English female field hockey players
English female badminton players